"There Was a Child Went Forth" is a poem written by Walt Whitman in 1855 and later included in the collection of poems entitled Autumn Rivulets. It is an account of a childhood, and is considered to be autobiographical. The poem presents a mixture of country and city scenes as the poet records his memories of early domestic scenes and Frank pen portraits of his parents. This poem also reveals his inclination towards his mother more than his father.

References

1855 poems
Poetry by Walt Whitman